Isabel Garcés Cerezal (1901–1981) was a Spanish stage and film actress.

Selected filmography

References

Bibliography
 Bentley, Bernard. A Companion to Spanish Cinema. Boydell & Brewer, 2008.

External links

1901 births
1981 deaths
Spanish film actresses
Spanish stage actresses
People from Madrid